Andrew McNally (1836–1904) was an American publisher and co-founder of the company Rand McNally.

Early life 
On March 4, 1836, McNally was born in Armagh, Ireland.

Career 
A printer by trade, he moved to Chicago in 1858 and got a job in a print shop owned by William H. Rand at a wage of $9 per week. 

In 1873, McNally and William H. Rand incorporated Rand, McNally & Co. With William H. Rand as President and McNally as Vice President.  Rand, McNally & Co. becoming one of the largest and best-known map publishers in history.

In 1888, McNally purchased 2,300 acres of Southern California land known as Rancho Los Coyotes from the Abel Stearns Rancho Trust. Rancho Los Coyotes is now known as present-day cities of Cerritos, La Mirada, Stanton, and Buena Park.

After Rand retired in 1899, McNally was president until his unexpected death from pneumonia in 1904 at his winter home in Altadena, California. For nearly 100 years the company was majority owned and headed by several generations of the McNally family. In 1997, the family divested its majority stake for a reported $500 million.

Personal life 

In 1857, McNally immigrated to New York City, New York.

In 1860, McNally married Delia Hyland. They had four children, Frederick G, Elizabeth, Helen, and Nannie.

In 1880, McNally moved to California.

On May 7, 1904, McNally died in Altadena, California. On May 14, 1904, McNally's funeral services were held in Chicago, Illinois. He was buried at Graceland Cemetery.

References

Further reading 
 
 
Rand McNally & Company: Information and Much More from Answers.com

External links 
 McNally Family Papers at the Newberry Library

1836 births
1904 deaths
American publishers (people)
Irish emigrants to the United States (before 1923)
People from Altadena, California
Businesspeople from Chicago
People from Armagh (city)
19th-century American businesspeople
Burials at Graceland Cemetery (Chicago)